Geno Silva (January 20, 1948 – May 9, 2020) was an American actor, best known for his role as The Skull, Alejandro Sosa's silent hitman in Scarface.

Silva also appeared in films such as 1941, Tequila Sunrise, The Lost World: Jurassic Park, Amistad, Mulholland Drive and A Man Apart.

Early life

Geno Silva was born in Albuquerque, New Mexico on January 20, 1948 to parents Jerry and Lucille Silva, and grew up in the neighborhood of Barelas with his brother Jerry Silva and sister Liz Gallegos.

Death

Silva died at his home in Los Angeles of complications from frontotemporal degeneration, a form of dementia, which he had been afflicted with for 15 years. He was survived by his wife Pamela Phillips, daughter Lucia Silva,, granddaughter Eva Redman, grandson Levon Redman, sister Liz Gallegos, and many nieces, nephews, and cousins. He was preceded in death by his parents, and his brother Jerry Silva.

Filmography

References

External links
 

1948 births
2020 deaths
Male actors from Albuquerque, New Mexico
Hispanic and Latino American male actors
American male actors of Mexican descent
Deaths from frontotemporal dementia
Deaths from dementia in California